Catherine Mason (born in Australia) is an art historian and author who specialises in digital art, especially computer art.

Biography
Mason was born in Australia, brought up in the United States, and educated in the United Kingdom.

In the late 1980s, Mason worked for an art dealer in Mayfair, London. In 1993, she received an undergraduate degree in the History of Art from Birkbeck College, University of London, followed by a master's degree in Museums & Gallery Management from City University, also in London. In the 1990s, Mason taught art appreciation courses in the Faculty for Continuing Education of Birkbeck College, the Workers Educational Association, and The Arts Society.

Mason's special interest is the history of computer art and digital art, beginning in 2002 when she joined an Arts & Humanities Research Council research project, CACHe (Computer Arts, Contexts, Histories, etc.), at Birkbeck College, This resulted in a co-edited book, White Heat Cold Logic, published in 2009.

Mason also assisted in the re-formation of the BCS Computer Arts Society. She also negotiated with the Victoria and Albert Museum (V&A) in London concerning donating an American collection of international computer art, the Patric Prince archive. This helped to develop the computer art collection at the V&A.

In 2006, Mason organized a screening and panel discussion of early British computer animation, Bits in Motion, at the National Film Theatre. In 2008, she authored A Computer in the Art Room, based on four years of research and interviews. During 2011–2014, she produced a monthly column concerning digital art for the BCS. In 2012, she discussed computer arts with John Wilson on the BBC Radio 4 programme Front Row. In 2017, she spoke about painting in the digital age on the TRT World television programme Showcase. She has advised on digital arts to organisations including The Art Fund, the BCS, Leonardo, SIGGRAPH, and a number of museums and galleries.

She married Keith Morris, a trustee of the Contemporary Art Society.

References

External links
 Catherine Mason website

Year of birth missing (living people)
Living people
Australian art historians
Alumni of Birkbeck, University of London
Alumni of City, University of London
Women art historians
British art historians
Digital art
Computer art